The 1876 United States presidential election in New Hampshire took place on November 7, 1876, as part of the 1876 United States presidential election. Voters chose five representatives, or electors to the Electoral College, who voted for president and vice president.

New Hampshire voted for the Republican nominee, Rutherford B. Hayes, over the Democratic nominee, Samuel J. Tilden. Hayes won the state by a narrow margin of 3.78%.

Results

See also
 United States presidential elections in New Hampshire

References

New Hampshire
1876
1876 New Hampshire elections